This page has the sports teams and venues in Nova Scotia's Halifax Regional Municipality:

Current teams

Major League

Major League

Minor League and Major Junior

Minor League and Major Junior

University

Former teams

Major venues

Indoor

Outdoor

References

Sport in Halifax, Nova Scotia
Nova Scotia sport-related lists
Sports teams